In the theory of three-dimensional rotation, Rodrigues' rotation formula, named after Olinde Rodrigues, is an efficient algorithm for rotating a vector in space, given an axis and angle of rotation.

This formula is variously credited to Leonhard Euler, Olinde Rodrigues, or a combination of the two. A detailed historical analysis in 1989 concluded that the formula should be attributed to Euler, and recommended calling it "Euler's finite rotation formula." This proposal has received notable support, but some others have viewed the formula as just one of many variations of the Euler–Rodrigues formula, thereby crediting both.

Statement

The intuition of the above formula is that the first term scales the vector down, while the second skews it (via vector addition) toward the new rotational position. The third term re-adds the height (relative to ) that was lost by the first term.

Then the unit axis vector can be written

This form may be more useful when two vectors defining a plane are involved. An example in physics is the Thomas precession which includes the rotation given by Rodrigues' formula, in terms of two non-collinear boost velocities, and the axis of rotation is perpendicular to their plane.

Derivation 

Using the dot and cross products, the vector  can be decomposed into components parallel and perpendicular to the axis ,

The component parallel to the axis will not change magnitude nor direction under the rotation,

only the perpendicular component will change direction but retain its magnitude, according to

and it follows

The form of the rotated component is similar to the radial vector in 2D planar polar coordinates  in the Cartesian basis

where ,  are unit vectors in their indicated directions.

Now the full rotated vector is

Matrix notation 

By , denote the "cross-product matrix" for the unit vector ,
 
That is to say,
 
for any vector . (In fact,  is the unique matrix with this property. It has eigenvalues 0 and ).

It follows that iterating the cross product is equivalent to multiplying by the cross-product matrix on the left; specifically:
 

The previous rotation formula in matrix language is therefore

So we have:

Note the coefficient of the leading term is now 1, in this notation: see the Lie-Group discussion below.

Factorizing the  allows the compact expression

where

is the rotation matrix through an angle  counterclockwise about the axis , and  the  identity matrix.

In terms of the matrix exponential,

To see that the last identity holds, one notes that

characteristic of a one-parameter subgroup, i.e. exponential, and that the formulas match for infinitesimal .

The Hodge dual of the rotation  is just  which  enables the extraction of both the axis of rotation and the sine of the angle of the rotation from the rotation matrix itself, with the usual ambiguity,

where .

When applying the Rodrigues' formula, however, the usual ambiguity could be removed with an extended form of the formula.

See also 
 Axis angle
 Rotation (mathematics)
 SO(3) and SO(4)
 Euler–Rodrigues formula

References 

Leonhard Euler, "Problema algebraicum ob affectiones prorsus singulares memorabile", Commentatio 407 Indicis Enestoemiani, Novi Comm. Acad. Sci. Petropolitanae  15 (1770), 75–106.
Olinde Rodrigues, "Des lois géométriques qui régissent les déplacements d'un système solide dans l'espace, et de la variation des coordonnées provenant de ces déplacements considérés indépendants des causes qui peuvent les produire", Journal de Mathématiques Pures et Appliquées 5 (1840), 380–440.  online.
Friedberg, Richard (2022). "Rodrigues, Olinde: "Des lois géométriques qui régissent les déplacements d'un systéme solide...", translation and commentary". arXiv:2211.07787.
Don Koks, (2006) Explorations in Mathematical Physics, Springer Science+Business Media,LLC. . Ch.4, pps 147 et seq. A Roundabout Route to Geometric Algebra

External links 
 Johan E. Mebius, Derivation of the Euler-Rodrigues formula for three-dimensional rotations from the general formula for four-dimensional rotations., arXiv General Mathematics 2007.
 For another descriptive example see: http://chrishecker.com/Rigid_Body_Dynamics#Physics_Articles, Chris Hecker, physics section, part 4. "The Third Dimension" – on page 3, section ``Axis and Angle'', http://chrishecker.com/images/b/bb/Gdmphys4.pdf

Rotation in three dimensions
Euclidean geometry
Orientation (geometry)

fr:Rotation vectorielle#Cas général